Colin O'Neil Browne is a politician from Antigua and Barbuda. He is a senator of the Upper House of Parliament in Antigua and Barbuda. He was appointed senator by Prime Minister Gaston Browne. Browne was appointed senator after the 2018 general elections held in Antigua and Barbuda on 26 March 2018.

References

See also 

 Senate (Antigua and Barbuda)

Living people
Antigua and Barbuda politicians
Members of the Senate (Antigua and Barbuda)
Antigua and Barbuda Labour Party politicians
Year of birth missing (living people)